Hamblin may refer to:

People 
Hamblin (surname)
Thomas Sowerby Hamblin, British actor and theatre manager
Henry Thomas Hamblin, British author
Robert W. Hamblin, professor and author
Hamblin González, Nicaraguan cyclist

Places 
Hamblin, Utah
Hamblin Bay, in Lake Mead

See also
Lee–Hamblin family
Hamlin (disambiguation)